Heiko is a traditional given name of Germanic origin. It is the short form of the name Heinrich—cognate of Henry.
Heiko is an old name. The first documentary evidence of this name comes from the 13th century. It means "the powerful ruler over the country", the "master of the country" or "the master of the house". and derives from old high German "heima" = "the home, the home country" and old high German "rihhi" = "powerful, rich". The female form is Heike.

Notable people called Heiko include:
Heiko Balz (born 1969), German sportsman
Heiko Bellmann (1950–2014), German zoologist
Heiko Bonan (born 1966), German soccer player
Heiko Butscher (born 1980), German soccer player
Heiko Daxl (1957–2012), German artist
 (born 1967), German actor
Heiko Echter von der Leyen, (born 1955), German professor of medicine and the husband of politician Ursula von der Leyen
Heiko Engelkes (1933–2008), German journalist
Heiko Fischer (1960–1989), German figure skater
 (1930–2017), German architect, pioneer of ecological architecture
Heiko Mathias Förster (born 1966), German conductor
Heiko Gerber (born 1972), German soccer player
 (born 1977), German handball player
 (born 1988), German automobile racer
Heiko Haumann (born 1945), German historian
 (born 1977), German politician
 (born 1969), German porn star
Heiko Herrlich (born 1971), German soccer player
 (born 1935), German politician
 (born 1975), German helicopter pilot
 (born 1973), German dancer
Heiko Kröger (born 1966), German yachtsman
, German musician
Heiko Laeßig (born 1968), German soccer player
Heiko Maas (born 1966), German politician
Heiko Meyer (born 1976), German athlete
Heiko Niidas (born 1983),  Estonian basketball player
Heiko Augustinus Oberman (1930–2001), Dutch professor
 (born 1968), German presenter
Heiko Peschke (born 1963), German soccer player
Heiko Petersen (born 1980), German soccer player
Heiko Rannula (born 1983),  Estonian basketball player and coach 
 (born 1966), German singer and actor
Heiko Schaffartzik (born 1984), German basketball player
Heiko Scholz (born 1966), German soccer player
 (born 1954), German soccer player
Heiko Steuer (born 1939), German archeologist
 (born 1968), German politician
 (born 1943), German manager
Heiko Triebener (born 1964), German musician
Heiko Uecker (born 1939), German literature scholar
 (born 1957), German journalist
Heiko Weber (born 1965), German soccer player
Heiko Westermann (born 1983), German soccer player
 (born 1972), German actor

Fictional characters 
 Heiko, Germanic version of the name of the character Wally, belonging to the Pokémon game franchise

References

Sources 

Given names
German masculine given names
Estonian masculine given names